Ram Prasad Shrestha was the Chief Justice of Nepal from 26 March 2010 to 5 May 2011.

References 

Chief justices of Nepal